Michele Gillespie is the Provost and Presidential Endowed Professor of Southern History at Wake Forest University in Winston-Salem, North Carolina.  She specializes in American history, focusing on gender, race, class, and region in the American South.  In 2005, she served as president of the Southern Association for Women Historians. She is series co-editor of New Directions in Southern History, published by the University Press of Kentucky, with William Link.

In 2015, Gillespie was named Dean of Wake Forest University's undergraduate college. In 2022, she was appointed Provost.

Gillespie received her Ph.D. from Princeton University, where she studied under the direction of James M. McPherson. She studied at Rice University in Houston, Texas as an undergraduate student.

Works
 Katharine and R.J. Reynolds: Partners of Fortune and the Making of the New South, (Athens: University of Georgia Press, 2012)
 Pious Pursuits:  German Moravians in the Atlantic World, Michele Gillespie and Robert M. Beachy, eds. (Oxford: Berghahn Books, 2007)
 Thomas Dixon and the Birth of Modern America, Michele Gillespie and Randal Hall (Baton Rouge: Louisiana State University Press, 2006)
 Neither Lady Nor Slave: Working Women of the Old South, Michele Gillespie and Susanna Delfino (Chapel Hill: University of North Carolina Press, 2002)
 Free Labor in an Unfree World: White Artisans in Slaveholding Georgia, 1789-1860, (Athens: University of Georgia Press, 2000)
 Taking Off the White Gloves: Southern Women and Women's History, Michele Gillespie and Catherine Clinton, eds. (Columbia: University of Missouri Press, 1998).
 The Devil's Lane: Sex and Race in the Early South, Catherine Clinton and Michele Gillespie, eds. (New York: Oxford University Press, 1997).

References

External links

21st-century American historians
Historians of the United States
Rice University alumni
Princeton University alumni
Wake Forest University faculty
Living people
American women historians
21st-century American women writers
Year of birth missing (living people)